The Women's 100m Backstroke at the 2007 World Aquatics Championships took place on 26 March (prelims & semifinals) and the evening of 27 March (finals) at the Rod Laver Arena in Melbourne, Australia. 87 swimmers were entered in the event, of which, 86 swam.

Existing records at the start of the event started were:
World Record (WR):  59.58, Natalie Coughlin (USA), 13 August 2002 in Fort Lauderdale, USA.
Championship Record (CR): 1:00.00, Natalie Coughlin (USA), Montreal 2005 (30 July 2005)

Results

Finals

Note: Coughlin's 50m split of 28.30 in the Final, established a new Championship Record for the distance. The existing CR for the distance had been 28.31 by China's Gao Chang from Montreal 2005.

Semifinals

Preliminaries

References

Women's 100m Backstroke Preliminary results from the 2007 World Championships. Published by OmegaTiming.com (official timer of the '07 Worlds); Retrieved 2009-07-11.
Women's 100m Backstroke Semifinals results from the 2007 World Championships. Published by OmegaTiming.com (official timer of the '07 Worlds); Retrieved 2009-07-11.
Women's 100m Backstroke Final results from the 2007 World Championships. Published by OmegaTiming.com (official timer of the '07 Worlds); Retrieved 2009-07-11.

Swimming at the 2007 World Aquatics Championships
2007 in women's swimming